The 2017–18 Algerian Ligue Professionnelle 2 will be the 54th season of the Algerian Ligue Professionnelle 2 since its establishment, and its fourth season under its current title. A total of 16 teams will contest the league.

Team changes
The following teams have changed division since the 2016–17 season.

To Algerian Ligue Professionnelle 2 

Relegated from Ligue 1
 RC Relizane
 CA Batna
 MO Béjaïa

Promoted from Championnat National Amateur
 AS Aïn M'lila
 RC Kouba
 WA Tlemcen

From Algerian Ligue Professionnelle 2 

Promoted to Ligue 1
 Paradou AC
 USM Blida
 US Biskra

Relegated to Championnat National Amateur
 WA Boufarik
 RC Arbaâ
 AS Khroub

Team overview

Stadiums and locations

League table

Result table

Clubs season-progress

Positions by round

Season statistics

Top scorers

Media coverage

See also
 2017–18 Algerian Ligue Professionnelle 1
 2017–18 Algerian Cup

References

External links
 Ligue de Football Professionnel
 Algerian Football Federation

Algerian Ligue 2 seasons
2
Algeria